Venera Rexhi (born 19 February 1996) is a Swedish footballer midfielder who plays for Mallbackens.

Honours 
Linköpings FC
Winner
 Svenska Cupen (2): 2013–14, 2014–15

Runner-up
 Svenska Supercupen: 2015

References

External links 
 

Living people
1996 births
Swedish women's footballers
Linköpings FC players
Damallsvenskan players
Women's association football midfielders
Växjö DFF players
Sundsvalls DFF players
Elitettan players
Mallbackens IF players